The circumflex fibular artery (circumflex fibular branch, circumflex branch of posterior tibial artery, or circumflex peroneal branch of posterior tibial artery) is a branch of the posterior tibial artery which supplies blood to the knee.

The artery branch of the anterior tibial artery, at its initial (or superior) segment, winds around the neck of the fibula and joins patellar network.

References

External links
 

Arteries of the lower limb